Kharagpur Assembly constituency is an assembly constituency in Paschim Medinipur district in the Indian state of West Bengal.

Overview
As per orders of the Delimitation Commission, No. 228 Kharagpur Assembly constituency is composed of the following: Kharagpur I community development block, and Banpura, Panchkhuri I, Panchkhuri II, Pathra and Shiromoni gram panchayats of Midnapore Sadar community development block.

Kharagpur Assembly constituency is part of No. 34 Medinipur (Lok Sabha constituency).

Members of Legislative Assembly 
 1962 : Mrityunjoy Jana of Congress
 1987 : Nazmul Haque (CPM) 
 1991 : Nazmul Haque (CPM) 
 1996 : Nazmul Haque (CPM)
 2001 : Nazmul Haque (CPM)
 2006 : Nazmul Haque (CPM) 
 2011 : Nazmul Haque (CPM) 
 2016 : Dinen Roy (AITC)  
 2021 : Dinen Roy (AITC)

Election results

2021

2016

2011

  

.# Swing calculated on Congress+Trinamool Congress vote percentages taken together in 2006.

1977-2006
Sk. Nazmul Haque of CPI(M) won the Kharagpur Rural assembly seat five times in a row from 1987 to 2006. He defeated Ajit Maity of Trinamool Congress in 2006 and 2001, Ranjit Basu of Congress in 1996, Nirmal Ghosh of Congress in 1991 and Ranjit Basu of Congress in 1987. Sk. Siraj Ali of CPI(M) defeated Deben Das, Independent, in 1982 Deben Das of CPI in 1977. Contests in most years were multi cornered but only winners and runners are being mentioned.

1951-1972
Between 1957 and 1972 the seat was known as Kharagpur Local. Ajit Kumar Basu of Congress won in 1972 and 1971. Deben Das of CPI won in 1969 and 1967. Mrityunjoy Jana of Congress won in 1962. Kharagpur Local was a dual seat in 1957. It was won by Krishna Prasad Mondal and Mrityunjoy Jana, both of Congress. In independent India's first election in 1951, Kharagpur had a single seat, which was won by Muhammad Momtaz Moulana of Congress.

References

Assembly constituencies of West Bengal
Politics of Paschim Medinipur district
Kharagpur